Moss Hill is a mountain in Barnstable County, Massachusetts. It is located north of Sagamore in the Town of Bourne. Discovery Hill is located southwest and Sagamore Hill is located east of Moss Hill.

References

Mountains of Massachusetts
Mountains of Barnstable County, Massachusetts